"Don't Know What to Do" is an electro pop/rock track by New Zealand singer Dane Rumble. It is the second single taken from Rumble's debut solo album, The Experiment. The track was released as a digital single in February 2009.

Single information
Rumble says the song is about his love/hate relationship with music. "I've experienced so many ups and downs in this game... and I still can't stop." Dane once again worked with Ivan Slavov for the music video, who had already directed the video for "Always Be Here". The song was sent to Australian contemporary hit radio on 29 November 2010.

"Don't Know What to Do" debuted on the New Zealand Singles Chart on 27 July 2009 at #36. The song has so far peaked at number 10, becoming Rumble's second consecutive top 20 single as a solo artist and his first top ten hit.

"Don't Know What to Do" also debuted on the Top 40 the same week Dane's previous single "Always Be Here" drops out of the Top 40.

On 31 January 2010, "Don't Know What to Do" was certified Gold with sales of over 7,500 in New Zealand.

Music video

The music video for "Don't Know What to Do" was released at the iTunes Store on 16 February 2009, the same day as the single and "Always Be Here".

Promotional events
24 August 2009 – More FM Radio
25 August 2009 – ZM Radio Interview
18 September 2009 – The Transmission Room Gig
24 September 2009 – The Edge Nudie Nuptials Performance
24 September 2009 – Juice Bar Gig
26 September 2009 – C4 Top 40 Countdown

Chart performance

References

2009 singles
Dane Rumble songs